Frucade is a soft drink created in 1953 in Rosenheim, Bavaria by Adalbert Conrads and Karl Grün. It is a carbonated orange drink, with a slight taste of exotic fruits. 

Frucade was spotlighted in the 1995 ORF Nette Leit Show (Nice People Show), when it was offered by host Hermes Phettberg to guests as an alternative to eggnog.

See also
 List of brand name soft drinks products
 List of soft drink flavors

External links
 Frucade Homepage 
 Official History

Citrus sodas